Symphony in E can refer to:

List of symphonies in E minor
List of symphonies in E major

See also
List of symphonies by key